"Love Working on You" is a song written by Jim Collins and Craig Wiseman, and recorded by American country music artist John Michael Montgomery.  It was released in March 1998 as the first single from his album Leave a Mark.  It peaked at number 14 in the United States, while peaking at number 8 in Canada.

Critical reception
Larry Flick, of Billboard magazine reviewed the song favorably saying that it "kicks off with a rootsy guitar intro that gives way to Montgomery's solid performance." He goes on to say that Petocz's production has a "raw and earthly edge that seems to bring out the best in Montgomery's vocals."

Music video
The music video was directed by Jim Shea and premiered in mid-1998.

Chart positions
"Love Working on You" debuted at number 74 on the U.S. Billboard Hot Country Singles & Tracks for the week of March 14, 1998.

Year-end charts

References

1998 singles
1998 songs
John Michael Montgomery songs
Songs written by Jim Collins (singer)
Songs written by Craig Wiseman
Atlantic Records singles